WTMO-CD (channel 31) is a low-power, Class A television station in Orlando, Florida, United States, broadcasting the Spanish-language Telemundo network. Owned and operated by NBCUniversal's Telemundo Station Group, the station has studios at the intersection of Sand Lake Road and Orange Blossom Trail in unincorporated Orange County (using an Orlando mailing address), and its transmitter is located on Lake Sparling Road in Pine Hills.

WTMO-CD is simulcast on the third digital subchannel of independent station WRDQ (channel 27, owned by Cox Media Group), as well as on translators WKME-CD (channel 21) in Kissimmee, and WMVJ-CD (channel 29) in Melbourne.

History
Until February 9, 2007, WTMO's primary signal (as WTMO-LP) was the WKME transmitter. Until early 2006 at the latest, it was located on channel 40, but moved to channel 15 shortly before WACX signed on its digital signal on channel 40. Based in Kissimmee, this signal is far enough away with a directional pattern towards Kissimmee, so it would not interfere with WCEU (now WDSC-TV), which also broadcasts on channel 15. As a result, channel 15's coverage area only covers Kissimmee, forcing WTMO to reach the rest of the Orlando area via cable. In late 2006, ZGS acquired WDYB, WMVJ, and the channel 31 license (then WPXG-LP) from Tiger Eye Broadcasting to expand WTMO's over-the-air reach. The station began broadcasting in digital on RF channel 31 on 10 August 2011.

On December 4, 2017, NBCUniversal's Telemundo Station Group announced its purchase of ZGS' 13 television stations. The sale was completed on February 1, 2018. WTMO is now owned by the same company that also owns nearby Universal Orlando Resort, although the resort is part of a different subsidiary of NBCUniversal.

Technical information

Subchannels
The station's digital signal is multiplexed:

Translator

News operation
WTMO produces its own noon, 5, 5:30, 6 and 11 p.m. newscasts on weekdays and 6 and 11 p.m. newscasts on weekends known as Noticias Telemundo 31.

References

External links

Telemundo Station Group
TMO-CD
Low-power television stations in the United States
Television channels and stations established in 1992
TMO-CD
1992 establishments in Florida
TeleXitos affiliates
LX (TV network) affiliates